The 2014 Grand Prix cycliste de Gatineau was a one-day women's cycle  race held in Canada on 7 June 2014. The race has an UCI rating of 1.1.

References

Grand Prix cycliste de Gatineau
Grand Prix cycliste de Gatineau
Grand Prix cycliste de Gatineau
Cycle races in Canada